KAWX-LP (93.1 FM, also at 94.9 FM via translator in the Hatfield - Cove area) was a radio station broadcasting a Christian teaching format. Licensed to Mena, Arkansas, United States, it served the Polk County area. The station aired such programing as Grace to You with John MacArthur, Core Christianity, Renewing Your Mind with the late Dr. R.C. Sproul, & Truth for Life with Alistair Begg.

Licensee Community Radio, Inc. surrendered KAWX-LP's license to the Federal Communications Commission on January 31, 2023, and it was cancelled the same day.

References

External links

AWX-LP
AWX-LP
Radio stations established in 2015
2015 establishments in Arkansas
Radio stations disestablished in 2023
2023 disestablishments in Arkansas
Defunct radio stations in the United States
Defunct religious radio stations in the United States
AWX-LP